Fineberg is a surname. Notable people with the surname include:

Harvey V. Fineberg (born 1945), American physician
Joseph Fineberg (1886–1957), Polish translator
Joshua Fineberg (born 1969), American composer
Larry Fineberg (born 1945), Canadian playwright
Richard A. Fineberg, American investigative journalist